Gau-Bickelheim is an Ortsgemeinde – a municipality belonging to a Verbandsgemeinde, a kind of collective municipality – in the Alzey-Worms district in Rhineland-Palatinate, Germany.

Geography

Location 
Gau-Bickelheim lies south of the Wißberg (mountain) in the Rheinhessisches Hügelland (Rhenish-Hessian Uplands).

Politics

Municipal council 
The council is made up of 16 council members, who were elected at the municipal election held on 7 June 2009, and the honorary mayor as chairman.

The municipal election held on 7 June 2009 yielded the following results:

Mayor 
Gau-Bickelheim's mayor is Jürgen Vollmer (WG Gau-Bickelheim).

Coat of arms 
The municipality's arms might be described thus: Per fess abased argent three pickaxes palewise in fess, the middle one abased, gules, and gules a wheel spoked of six of the first.

The pickaxes are a canting charge: “Pickaxe” is Pickel in German, which sounds rather like the second and third syllables of the municipality's name, Gau-Bickelheim. The escutcheon's base contains the Wheel of Mainz, an historical symbol of Electoral Mainz.

Town partnerships 
 Aiserey, Côte-d'Or, France

Culture and sightseeing

Buildings 
Pfarrkirche St. Martin (“Saint Martin’s Parish Church”)
Kreuzkapelle (“Cross Chapel”)

Economy and infrastructure

Transport 
Running through the municipality is Bundesstraße 420. Running nearby from northwest to southeast is the Autobahn A 61. The Gau-Bickelheim interchange (Nr. 52) is not right on Bundesstraße 420, but rather, it can be reached over Bundesstraße 50. The interchange itself is rather a sprawling one and looks somewhat like a half cloverleaf. This came about because the original plan called for there to be an interchange between the A 60 and the A 61 here. In the mid 1990s, an off-highway service centre was built nearby.

Gau-Bickelheim has at its disposal a railway station on the Rheinhessenbahn.

Public institutions 
Gau-Bickelheim highway police station

Notable people 
 The writer Arno Schmidt lived for a short while in Gau-Bickelheim after the Second World War as an Umsiedler (member of a mass migration). The municipality is mentioned in passing at the beginning of the narrative Schwarze Spiegel (“Black Mirrors”). The narrative Die Umsiedler gives this time a literary treatment.

References

External links 

Municipality’s official webpage 
Gau-Bickelheim wine learning path 

Alzey-Worms